Kabir (sometimes spelled kabeer) is an honorific title in the Harari  language. It commonly designates a  Muslim scholar or a teacher. Enrico Cerulli states the term is of Ethiopian Semitic origin. 

According to the Afar locals in Afambo a Harari Muslim scholar by the name Kabir Hamza arrived into the region, and introduced Hanafi legal school into Aussa his descendants today are known as "Kabirtu" and identify as Harla. Kabirtu in Afar trace their lineage to the Walasma dynasty. Kabir Hamza Mahmud al-Awsiyyi a Harla clan affiliate was known as the scholar of Aussa.

People with the title include:

Kabir Khalil, scholar in the Emirate of Harar
Kabir Muhammad, Muezzin of Ahmed ibn Ibrahim al-Ghazi
Kabir Ibrahim, Muezzin of Abun Adashe
Kabir Hamid, ancestor of the Wolane people
Kabir Abdulmuhaymin Abdulnasser, contemporary Harari scholar
Kabir Hassan, Qallu missionary

References

Noble titles